Globočica is a village in Municipality of Struga, North Macedonia.

Demographics
According to statistics gathered by Vasil Kanchov in 1900, Globočica was populated by 300 Bulgarian Exarchists. According to Dimitar Mishev, the village had 360 Bulgarian Exarchist residents.

During the years 1961-1964, inhabitants of Globochica moved to Struga; in 1903, the Cartographic Society of Sofia registered the village as inhabited by Albanians, as with all of the villages in Malësia. Nowadays, people descended from this village have been assimilated and identify as Macedonians.

References

Villages in Struga Municipality
Albanian communities in North Macedonia